Gubernatorial Election in Perm Krai were held on 10 September 2017.

Background
6 February 2017, the Governor Viktor Basargin announced his resignation. The acting Governor was appointed Maxim Reshetnikov.

Candidates
Candidates on the ballot:

Opinion polls

Result

See also
2017 Russian gubernatorial elections

References

2017 elections in Russia
2017 Russian gubernatorial elections
Politics of Perm Krai